Ángel Pestaña Nuñez (1886–1937) was a Spanish Anarcho-syndicalist and later the founder of the Syndicalist Party.

Life 

In April 1919, after Catalonia was shaken by the Canadenca protests, Pestaña was arrested and detained, and the paper banned. He left for Bolshevist Russia in 1920, in order to be present at the 2nd Comintern Congress and the preliminary sessions of the Profintern.

Together with his mentor Salvador Seguí, Pestaña opposed the paramilitary and terrorist actions advocated and carried out by other members of the CNT. In August 1922, he was the victim of an assassination attempt while giving a speech in Manresa, as part of the violent repression measures taken by the Spanish authorities. The indignation caused throughout Spain by news of this act brought the dismissal of several government officials, as well as an end to legislation that permitted the murder of trade union activists.

After the proclamation of the Second Spanish Republic in 1931, the conflict between Pestaña's group and FAI deepened: Pestaña initiated the issue of Manifiesto de los Treinta/Manifest dels Trenta ("Manifesto of the Thirty"), a clear condemnation of the Federación's tactics, one which got him expelled from the CNT in August.

Legacy
A homage to Pestaña was made on 13 February 1938 at the Fuencarral Theater in Madrid, in commemoration of his birth. The tribute was attended by speakers of the Syndicalist Party, the Communist Party of Spain, the Popular Front, the Iberian Anarchist Federation, the Republican Left and the National Confederation of Labour.

A square in the Nou Barris district of Barcelona is named Ángel Pestaña in his honour.

References

Sources

Peirats, José (2011). The CNT in the Spanish Revolution, Volume I. PM Press. .

1886 births
1937 deaths
People from Ponferrada
Syndicalist Party politicians
Members of the Congress of Deputies of the Second Spanish Republic
Confederación Nacional del Trabajo members
Spanish anarchists
Spanish people of the Spanish Civil War (Republican faction)
Anarcho-syndicalists
20th-century Spanish journalists